The 1917 Fort Sheridan football team represented Officers Reserve Training Camp at Fort Sheridan located north of Chicago during the 1917 college football season. The team included former Michigan Wolvereines stars Albert Benbrook and Ernest Allmendinger, and former Chicago Maroons star Paul Des Jardien.

Schedule

References

Fort Sheridan